Mostafa Kamal (born October 23, 1973) is a retired Egyptian football goalkeeper who has played for several teams in the Egyptian Premier League.

He was regularly called up for the national Egyptian football team in the past but never managed to get a senior cap.

References

Notes
List of past clubs from footballdatabase.eu

1973 births
Living people
Egyptian footballers
Egyptian Premier League players
Association football goalkeepers
Al Ahly SC players
El Qanah FC players
ENPPI SC players
Asyut Petroleum SC players
El Entag El Harby SC players
Misr Lel Makkasa SC players